Si-young, also spelled Shi-young, Si-yeong or Shi-yeong, is a Korean unisex given name. The meaning differs based on the hanja used to write each syllable of the name. There are 54 hanja with the reading "shi" and 44 hanja with the reading "young" on the South Korean government's official list of hanja which may be registered for use in given names.

People with this name include:

Yi Si-yeong (1868-1953), Korean male politician, independence activist, educator and neo-Confucianist scholar
Lee Si-young (born 1950), South Korean male writer
Lee Si-young (born Lee Eun-rae, 1982), South Korean actress and former amateur boxer
Lee Si-young (born 1997), South Korean male footballer

See also
List of Korean given names

References

Korean unisex given names